Gymnocypris is a genus of fish in the family Cyprinidae endemic to China.

Species
There are currently 10 recognized species in this genus:
 Gymnocypris chilianensis S. C. Li & S. Y. Chang, 1974
 Gymnocypris chui T. L. Tchang, T. H. Yueh & H. C. Hwang, 1964
 Gymnocypris dobula Günther, 1868
 Gymnocypris eckloni Herzenstein, 1891
 Gymnocypris namensis (Y. F. Wu & M. L. Ren, 1982)
 Gymnocypris pengquensis Y. T. Tang, C. G. Feng, K. Y. Wanghe, G. G. Li & K. Zhao, 2016 
 Gymnocypris potanini Herzenstein, 1891
 Gymnocypris przewalskii (Kessler, 1876)
 Gymnocypris scleracanthus Tsao, C. Z. Wu, Chen & Zhu, 1992
 Gymnocypris waddellii Regan, 1905

References

 
Taxa named by Albert Günther
Freshwater fish of China
Cyprinid fish of Asia